The second season of the television comedy series Mom ran from October 30, 2014 and concluded on April 30, 2015, on CBS in the United States. The season was produced by Chuck Lorre Productions and Warner Bros. Television, with series creators Chuck Lorre, Eddie Gorodetsky and Gemma Baker serving as executive producer.

The series follows Christy Plunkett (Anna Faris), a single mother who—after dealing with her battle with alcoholism and drug addiction—decides to restart her life in Napa, California's wine country, working as a waitress  at the restaurant Rustic Fig and attending Alcoholics Anonymous meetings. She lives with her mother Bonnie Plunkett (Allison Janney), who is also a recovering drug and alcohol addict, as well as her teenage daughter Violet (Sadie Calvano), who was born when Christy was 16. Christy also has a younger son Roscoe (Blake Garrett Rosenthal) by her deadbeat ex-husband Baxter (Matt Jones). Other prominent characters in the series include the manager of Rustic Fig, Gabriel (Nate Corddry) and the head chef, Rudy (French Stewart). Mimi Kennedy who plays the wise Marjorie, Christy and Bonnie's friend and co-Alcoholics Anonymous member, was upgraded to series regular status for this season. The episodes are usually titled with two odd topics that are mentioned in that episode.

Season two of Mom initially aired Thursdays in the United States at 8:30 p.m. after The Big Bang Theory, but it has aired in other time slots on the same night at various points of the season.

Cast

Main
 Anna Faris as Christy Plunkett
 Allison Janney as Bonnie Plunkett
 Sadie Calvano as Violet Plunkett
 Matt Jones as Baxter
 Nate Corddry as Gabriel
 French Stewart as Chef Rudy
 Mimi Kennedy as Marjorie Armstrong
 Blake Garrett Rosenthal as Roscoe

Recurring
 Kevin Pollak as Alvin Lester Biletnikoff
 Jaime Pressly as Jill Kendall
 Beth Hall as Wendy Harris
 Reggie De Leon as Paul
 Octavia Spencer as Regina Tompkins
 Jonny Coyne as Victor Perugian
 Don McManus as Steve Casper
 David Krumholtz as Gregory Munchnik
 Spencer Daniels as Luke
 Sara Rue as Candace Hayes
 Courtney Henggeler as Claudia
 Amy Hill as Beverly Tarantino
 Charlie Robinson as Mr. Munson
 Mary Pat Gleason as Mary
 Ryan Cartwright as Jeff Taylor
 Melissa Tang as Suzanne Taylor

Special guest stars
 Ed Asner as Jack Bumgartner
 Beverly D'Angelo as Lorraine Biletnikoff
 Colin Hanks as Andy Dreeson

Guest stars
 Crista Flanagan as Beth
 Richard Riehle as John
 Rick Fox as James Kendall
 Mark Saul as Cooper
 Alan Rachins as Jed
 Clark Duke as Jackie Biletnikoff
 Chris Smith as Douglas Biletnikoff
 Toby Huss as Bill
 April Bowlby as Selene
 George Paez as Ramone
 John Charles Meyer as Jesus
 Fred Tatasciore as Voice of Canister
 Tom Amandes as Richard
 Kelly Stables as Kathy

Episodes

Ratings

References

External links
Episode recaps at CBS.com
 at Internet Movie Database

Mom (TV series)
2014 American television seasons
2015 American television seasons